The Peavey Bandit 112 is a guitar amplifier produced by Peavey Electronics. It is a solid state amplifier designed for Jazz, Blues, Rock and Heavy metal musicians.

Characteristics
100 watts (RMS) into 4 ohms or 80 watts (RMS) into 8 ohms
12" speaker
High and Low Gain inputs
Tube emulation circuitry (TransTube)
3-band passive EQ on each channel
3 voicing presets on each channel
Reverb with level control
Boost with level control
Speaker simulated output with level control

References

Instrument amplifiers
Peavey amplifiers